410 Squadron or 410th Squadron may refer to:

 410 Tactical Fighter Operational Training Squadron, Canada
 410th Bombardment Squadron, United States
 410th Flight Test Squadron, United States

See also
 410th Wing